Thomas J. Hushek (born 1963) is an American diplomat who served as the United States Ambassador to South Sudan from 2018 to 2020.

Education
Hushek received a Bachelor of Arts degree in political science from the University of Wisconsin and a Master of International Affairs in human rights and Soviet studies from Columbia University.

Career
Hushek is a career member of the Senior Foreign Service. He has been working for the State Department since 1988. He has served at multiple capacities including being the Deputy Chief of Mission at the U.S. Mission to the International Organizations in Vienna, Principal Deputy Assistant Secretary in the Bureau of Conflict and Stabilization Operations and has worked in U.S. embassies in Micronesia, Russia and Tajikistan.

United States Ambassador to South Sudan
On August 3, 2017, Hushek was nominated as the United States Ambassador to South Sudan. On April 26, 2018, the Senate confirmed his nomination by voice vote. His mission terminated on July 17, 2020.

Personal life
Hushek speaks Russian and Persian.

See also
List of ambassadors appointed by Donald Trump

References 

1963 births
Living people
Ambassadors of the United States to South Sudan
United States Foreign Service personnel
 University of Wisconsin–Madison College of Letters and Science alumni
21st-century American diplomats
School of International and Public Affairs, Columbia University alumni